Half sari function or Langa Voni Telugu: లంగా ఓణి, Pavadai Dhavani Tamil: பாவாடை தாவணி, Langa Davani Kannada: ಲಂಗ ದಾವಣಿ. In South India, the Ritu Kala Samskara ceremony or Ritushuddhi is an Indian Hindu ceremony performed when a girl wears a sari for the first time. It is the celebration of when a girl's rite of passage after menarche (first menstruation) and she is deemed a young woman both physically and spiritually. Langa voni is traditional clothing for unmarried girls in South India.

The Ritual
Ritusuddhi, also called as Ritu Kala Samskara, is the coming of age ceremony for girls, after menarche or first menstruation. This milestone in a girl's life is observed by her family and friends, with gifts and her wearing a sari for the ritual. The rite of passage is celebrated, in modern times, as a "half-saree party" or half-sari function, where the female relatives and friends of the girl gather, and she receives and wears a half-saree and other gifts. Thereafter, at ceremonious events, she wears the half-sarees, until her marriage when she puts on a full sari.

In South India coming of age ceremony or rites of passage is celebrated when a girl reaches puberty. She wears a new langa voni during the first part of the ceremony and then she is gifted her first sari by her maternal uncle , which she wears during the second half of the ceremony. This marks her transition into womanhood

The tradition of presenting a langa voni begins with the girl's first naming ceremony Namakaran and her first rice feeding ceremony called Annaprashana. She receives her last one at her coming of age ceremony.

In Shaktism the Earth's menstruation is celebrated during the Ambubachi Mela, an annual fertility festival held in June, in Assam, India. During Ambubachi, the annual menstruation course of the goddess Kamakhya is worshipped in the Kamakhya Temple.

See also
Culture and menstruation
Langa voni
Saṃskāra
Bar and Bat Mitzvah

References

Hindu rituals
Hindu religious clothing
Hindu culture
Samskaras
Menstrual cycle